Peter Carsten (30 April 1928 – 20 April 2012) was a German actor and film producer. He appeared in 90 films between 1953 and 1999, including in supporting roles, Dark of the Sun  (1968), Hannibal Brooks (1969), Madame Bovary (1969), And God Said to Cain (1970) and Zeppelin (1971).

Selected filmography

 The Immortal Vagabond (1953)
 The Beginning Was Sin (1954) - Marko, Knecht
 08/15 (1954) - Stabsgefreiter Kowalski
 The Song of Kaprun (1955) - Bertl
  (1955) - Stabsgefreiter Kowalski
 The Happy Village (1955) - Gerd Bunje, Müller
  (1955) - Stabsgefreiter Kowalski
 Weil du arm bist, mußt du früher sterben (1956) - Erich Klein
 Fruit in the Neighbour's Garden (1956) - Briefträger
 Nina (1956) - Major Tubaljow
 Like Once Lili Marleen (1956) - Toni Knoll
 Love (1956) - Jan Hopper
 The Story of Anastasia (1956) - Soldat Tschaikowski
 Sand, Love and Salt (1957) - Alberto
 Song of Naples (1957) - Ercole Ercurio
 Scherben bringen Glück (1957) - Toni
 The Devil Strikes at Night (1957) - Mollwitz
 The Wide Blue Road (1957) - Riva, 2nd Coast Guard Officer
 Scampolo (1958) - Cesare
 U 47 – Kapitänleutnant Prien (1958)
 Peter Voss, Thief of Millions (1958) - Willy
 Stalingrad: Dogs, Do You Want to Live Forever? (1959) - Gefreiter Krämer
 Freddy, the Guitar and the Sea (1959) - Jan
 Heiße Ware (1959) - Otto Faber
 Heimat, deine Lieder (1959) - Lastwagenfahrer Klemke
 As the Sea Rages (1959) - Panagos
 Triplets on Board (1959) - Fred Larsen
 Freddy and the Melody of the Night (1960) - Karl Bachmann
 Under Ten Flags (1960) - Lt. Mohr
 Crime Tango (1960) - Boxer-Franz
 Headquarters State Secret (1960) - Otto Panzke
 Mal drunter – mal drüber (1960) - Benno Biller
 When the Heath Is in Bloom (1960) - Klaus
  (1960) - Hauptmann Katers
 Girl from Hong Kong (1961) - Volkert
  (1961) - Bastian
  (1961) - Bastian
 Das Geheimnis der schwarzen Koffer (1962) - Ponko, ein Bettler
 The Legion's Last Patrol (1962) - Barbarossa
  (1963) - Obertgefreiter Blättchen
 Wochentags immer (1963) - Kaiser
 Storm Over Ceylon (1963) - Hermann
 Time of the Innocent (1964, producer)
 The Art of Living (1965, producer)
 13 Days to Die (1965) - Hans Warren
 A Study in Terror (1965) - Max Steiner
 Tender Scoundrel (1966) - Otto Hanz
 The Quiller Memorandum (1966) - Hengel
 My Name Is Pecos (Due once di piombo) (1966) - Steve
 All'ombra delle aquile (1966)
 Da Berlino l'apocalisse (1967) - Günther
 The Vengeance of Fu Manchu (1967) - Kurt
 Heubodengeflüster (1967) - Florian Maderer
 Massacre in the Black Forest (1967)
 Dark of the Sun (1968) - Capt. Henlein
 Hannibal Brooks (1969) - Kurt
 Madame Bovary (1969) - Rudolf Boulanger
 11 Uhr 20 (1970, TV miniseries) - Korska
 And God Said to Cain (1970) - Acombar
 Mafia Connection (1970) - Orlando Lo Presti
 When You're With Me (1970) - Joe Falk
 Mr. Superinvisible (1970) - Pomeranz
 Zeppelin (1971) - Major Tauntler
 Web of the Spider (1971) - Dr. Carmus
 Where the Bullets Fly (1972)
 Hell River (1974) - Col. Henke
 Milano: il clan dei calabresi (1974) - Maraschi
 Devojacki most (1976) - Nemacki major
 Vrhovi Zelengore (1976) - Oberst
  (1977) - Harald Sommer
 Hajka (1977) - Zandar
 Stici pre svitanja (1978) - Major Kramer
 Moment (1978) - The German from Vrsac
 The Rip-Off (1978) - Van Stratten
 Trener (1978) - Knez
 Devil's Island (1979) - commander of German ship
 Partizanska eskadrila (1979) - General general
 Rad na odredjeno vreme (1980) - Stranger in the hotel
 Variola Vera (1982) - Epidemiologist from the UN
 Twilight Time (1982) - Factory Gateman
 Wallenberg: A Hero's Story (1985, TV film) - Von Fremd
 Donator (1989) - Maj. Siegfried Handke
 Ein Schloß am Wörthersee (1990–1993, TV series) - Casino Director
  (1991)
 Kad mrtvi zapjevaju (1998) - Kurt Müller

References

External links

1928 births
2012 deaths
20th-century German male actors
German male film actors
German film producers
People from Weißenburg in Bayern
Film people from Bavaria